Trevor Briggs (third ¼ 1948 – 2012) was an English professional rugby league footballer who played in the 1960s and 1970s.

Background
Trevor Briggs' birth was registered in Leeds district, West Riding of Yorkshire, England.

Playing career

BBC2 Floodlit Trophy Final appearances
Trevor Briggs played   in Bramley's 15-7 victory over Widnes in the 1973 BBC2 Floodlit Trophy Final during the 1973–74 season at Naughton Park, Widnes on Tuesday 18 December 1973.

Genealogical information
Trevor Briggs was the son of Ronald Briggs and Ethel (née Tattersdale), and the older brother of Graham Briggs.

References

External links
Search for "Briggs" at rugbyleagueproject.org
Search for "Trevor Briggs" at britishnewspaperarchive.co.uk
Bramley Legends - Trevor Briggs

1948 births
2012 deaths
Batley Bulldogs players
Bramley RLFC players
Castleford Tigers players
English rugby league players
Keighley Cougars players
Leeds Rhinos players
Rugby league five-eighths
Rugby league halfbacks
Rugby league players from Leeds